Eric Bogosian (born April 24, 1953) is an American actor, playwright, monologuist, novelist, and historian. Descended from Armenian American immigrants, he grew up in Watertown and Woburn, Massachusetts, and attended University of Chicago and Oberlin College. His numerous plays include subUrbia (1994) and Pulitzer Prize in Drama finalist Talk Radio (1987), which were adapted to film by Richard Linklater and Oliver Stone, respectively. He also starred as Arno in the Safdie brothers' critically acclaimed film Uncut Gems (2019).

Bogosian has appeared in a variety of plays, films, and television series throughout his career. His television roles include Captain Danny Ross in Law & Order: Criminal Intent (2006–2010), Lawrence Boyd on Billions (2017–2018), and Gil Eavis on Succession (since 2018). He has also been involved in New York City ballet production, and has written several novels as well as the historical nonfiction Operation Nemesis (2015).

Early life
Bogosian was born in Boston, Massachusetts, the son of Edwina (née Jamgochian), a hairdresser and instructor, and Henry Bogosian, an accountant. He spent his early childhood in Watertown, Massachusetts, home to a large Armenian-American community which included his grandparents, survivors of the Armenian genocide. His family moved to nearby Woburn in 1960. He became interested in theater while attending Woburn Memorial High School, and would later base his play subUrbia on his youth in Woburn's Four Corners neighborhood. He attended the University of Chicago before graduating from Oberlin College.

Career
Bogosian is an author and actor known for his plays Talk Radio and subUrbia as well as numerous one-man shows. In 1983, early in his career, Bogosian appeared in the music video for Jim Capaldi's song "That's Love".  In recent years he has starred on Broadway in Donald Margulies' Time Stands Still, published three novels, and was featured on Law & Order: Criminal Intent as Captain Danny Ross.

Stage
Between 1980 and 2000, six major solos written and performed by Eric Bogosian were produced Off-Broadway, garnering him three Obie Awards as well as the Drama Desk award. His first two solos, Men Inside and funHouse were presented at the New York Shakespeare Festival. His third, Drinking in America, was produced by American Place Theater. Sex, Drugs, Rock & Roll, Pounding Nails in the Floor with My Forehead and Wake Up and Smell the Coffee were all produced commercially Off-Broadway by Frederick Zollo.

Eric is also the author of six produced plays, including 1987's Talk Radio. Talk Radio was a finalist for Pulitzer Prize for Drama, but lost to Alfred Uhry's Driving Miss Daisy. In 2007, a Broadway revival of Talk Radio directed by Robert Falls starred Liev Schreiber. subUrbia was directed by Robert Falls and produced by Lincoln Center Theater in 1994. Other titles include Griller (Goodman Theater); Humpty Dumpty (The McCarter); Red Angel (Williamstown Theater Festival) and 1+1 (New York Stage and Film). Bogosian's one-person drama, Notes from Underground has had several productions, most recently starring Jonathan Ames at Performance Space 122.

In addition to his many appearances in his solo work and starring in his play, Talk Radio, Bogosian has also starred in Stephen Adly Guirgis' The Last Days of Judas Iscariot directed by Philip Seymour Hoffman (LAByrinth) and Donald Margulies' Time Stands Still directed by Daniel Sullivan (Manhattan Theater Club/Broadway).

Film
Bogosian's play Talk Radio was adapted to film in 1988 by Oliver Stone, garnering Bogosian the prestigious Berlin Film Festival Silver Bear. The film version of subUrbia (1996) was directed by Richard Linklater. His play Sex, Drugs, Rock & Roll was adapted to film in 1991. He has starred in several other films including Under Siege 2: Dark Territory and Wonderland. In addition, he has been featured in films by such directors as Woody Allen, Robert Altman, Taylor Hackford, Atom Egoyan and Agnieszka Holland.

Television
In television, Bogosian is best known for his starring role as Captain Danny Ross in the series Law & Order: Criminal Intent. In addition, he has appeared as a guest star on dramas and in 1994 created with Steven Spielberg the series High Incident for ABC television. He portrayed Barney Greenwald, defense attorney, in the TV film The Caine Mutiny Court Martial. He also appeared in the episode "His Story" on Scrubs as Dr. Cox's therapist and was recurring character Lawrence Boyd in Billions''' second season. In 1993, Bogosian played the role of Stan Paxton, Larry's ex standup partner in the series 'The Larry Sanders Show'. He has also appeared in HBO's show Succession as Senator Gil Eavis, and in the main cast of the AMC show Interview with the Vampire as Daniel Molloy, the reporter who interviews the titular vampire.

Books
Bogosian is the author of three novels published by Simon & Schuster: Mall, Wasted Beauty, and Perforated Heart. All of his dramatic work is in print, published by Theater Communication Group. In 2015, he published Operation Nemesis: The Secret Plot that Avenged the Armenian Genocide, a history of Operation Nemesis which involved a group of Armenian assassins who set out to avenge the deaths of the one and a half million victims of the Armenian genocide.

Dance
Bogosian founded the dance series at The Kitchen. During his charter tenure there, he produced the first concerts in New York City by Bill T. Jones and Arnie Zane, Karole Armitage and Molissa Fenley as well as dozens of other choreographers. In 2006, Bogosian acted as producer on the New York City Ballet's documentary, Bringing Back Balanchine.

Collaborations
In addition to working with Jo Bonney and Tad Savinar, other notable collaborations include Michael Zwack ("I Saw the Seven Angels"); Joe Hannan ("The Ricky Paul Show"); Glenn Branca ("The New World"); Robert Longo ("American Vanity"); Ann Magnuson (sketches at Folk City) and Elliot Sharp ("This Is Now!"). For the past six years Bogosian has been filming the 100monologues.com series with Travis Bogosian and Good Baby Films.

Awards
Bogosian has won the Obie Award three times as well as the Drama Desk Award. He received the prestigious "Silver Bear" at the 1989 Berlin Film Festival for his work on Talk Radio. He is a 2004 Guggenheim fellow and the recipient of two fellowships from the National Endowment for the Arts.

Personal life
In 1980, he married Jo Anne Bonney, with whom he has two sons, Harry and Travis Bogosian.

Filmography

Film

Television

Writing credits
 Men in Dark Times Scenes from the New World Sheer Heaven (1980)
 Men Inside (1981)
 The New World (1981)
 FunHouse (1983)
 Drinking in America (1986) (Winner of the Drama Desk Award for Outstanding One-Person Show)
 Talk Radio (1987) (also film version 1988)
 Sex, Drugs, Rock & Roll (1990)
 Notes from the Underground (1993)
 Pounding Nails in the Floor with My Forehead (1994)
 subUrbia (1994) (also film version 1996)
 Griller (1998)
 Mall (2000)
 Wake Up and Smell the Coffee (2000)
 Humpty Dumpty (2004)
 Non-profit Benefit Red Angel Wasted Beauty (2005)
 1+1 (2008)
 Perforated Heart (novel) (2009)
 Operation Nemesis'' (2015)

References

External links
 
 
 
 

1953 births
Living people
20th-century American dramatists and playwrights
20th-century American male actors
20th-century American male writers
21st-century American male actors
American male dramatists and playwrights
American male film actors
American male novelists
American male television actors
American male voice actors
American people of Armenian descent
Franklin Furnace artists
Male actors from Massachusetts
National Endowment for the Arts Fellows
Novelists from Massachusetts
Oberlin College alumni
Obie Award recipients
People from Woburn, Massachusetts
Performance art in New York City
Woburn Memorial High School alumni